Phaeoxantha epipleuralis is a species of tiger beetle in the subfamily Cicindelinae that was described by George Henry Horn in 1923. The species has been recorded in South America, particularly in Brazil.

References

Beetles described in 1923
Beetles of South America